Hockey Club Milano (better known as Hockey Club Milano Saima after its sponsor) was an ice hockey team in Milan, Italy.

History
The club was founded in 1985 and initially played in the Serie B. They made their debut in the Serie A during the 1988-89 season. Milano won their first and only Serie A championship in the 1990-91 season, where they finished in first place in both the first and final rounds.

The club was disbanded after the 1991-92 season, where they finished as runners-up after losing to the HC Devils Milano in the final. They did not participate in the 1992-93 season but were revived as Sportivi Ghiaccio Milano the following year. The new team played two seasons (1993-94 and 1994-95) in the Serie A, losing in the quarterfinals in 1994 and the semifinals in 1995. The club was then sold and became HC 24 Milan.

Achievements
Serie A champion (1): 1991.

References

Defunct ice hockey teams in Italy
Sport in Milan
1985 establishments in Italy
Ice hockey clubs established in 1985
1995 disestablishments in Italy
Ice hockey clubs disestablished in 1995